The Dragon's Back is a mountain ridge in southeastern Hong Kong Island, Hong Kong that passes through Shek O Peak. It lies within the Shek O Country Park. In 2019, the Dragon's Back Trail was selected by CNN as one of the world's 23 best trails. Dragon's Back is part of Stage 8 of the Hong Kong Trail.

Hiking information 
Destinations in the vicinity

Shek O Peak
Shek O
Big Wave Bay

Highlights

Paragliders hanging in the air and eventually drifting down to a beach at Shek O.
 People flying radio-controlled gliders.

Overview

Information and hiking etiquette in Hong Kong

 Hong Kong's Country Parks have no trash bins, so hikers are asked to hang on to their litter until they exit the Country Parks

Try to limit boombox music volume to a minimum in Country Parks to let everyone enjoy the sounds of nature.
 Big Wave Bay Beach (the End point) and nearby Shek O Beach are two different beaches. There is a short bus service that links the two beaches.
 Some parts of this trail are rocky, so travellers should use proper footwear. Slippers and sandals are not advisable.
At Pottinger Gap yue, hikers can extend the hike by walking along the easy Pottinger Peak Country Trail eastward for about 20 minutes and then make a 90-degree right turn onto a newly made path that descends southward for another 20 minutes to the Big Wave Bay Prehistoric Rock Carvings de, yue].

See also 

Shek O Peak
Shek O
Big Wave Bay

References

External links
 Discover Hong Kong - Dragon's Back
 HK Leisure & Cultural Services Dept. - Hiking Scheme
 Map Location

Mountain ranges of Hong Kong
Southern District, Hong Kong
Ridges of Asia
Hiking trails in Hong Kong